Mladen Stanev (born 1974) is a Bulgarian conductor.

Early life and education
Mladen was born in 1974 in Kotel (Bulgaria). He was a conductor at the National High School for folk music in Kotel  from 1988 to 1993. He earned his master's degree in choir conducting from State Music Academy "P.Vladigerov", Sofia . In 2006 he participated in a Master class with Erwin Ortner (Sasha Popov Music Academy).

Career
In 1999 Stanev became the conductor of the Choir of State Opera Stara Zagora . He worked on a wide variety of opera repertoire, cantata and oratorio genre, vocal and symphony music. He was conductor of opera performances for children and concerts. He participated in opera tours with the state opera and co-operation with other opera houses and companies (Verdi opera - Ruse; State opera – Varna; Eventa GmbH; Konzertdirektion Schlote Ges.m.b.H. - Salzburg; etc.) in Europe – Austria (Salzburg – Grosse Festspielhaus - International Theatrerbende 2003,2004,2006), Germany, France, Spain, Portugal, Switzerland, Luxembourg, Denmark, Greece (Megaro Music Thessaloniki Concert Hall Organization), and USA (Opera Verdi Europa&Columbia Artist Management)

In 2003 he became the conductor of the mixed Choir “Petko Stainov” – cultural house "Iskra", Kazanlak. The choir is a leading ensemble in the region of Kazanlak (Valley of roses). They Perform a classical choral repertoire - from Renaissance to 21st century, orthodox chants, works by Bulgarian composers, Requiem - W.A.Mozart. They Participated in the Turkey choir festival in Ankara 2003. They have performed concerts in Italy (Ceccano, Veroli, Ferentino) in 2006 , and Slovak in 2007.

He is the president of the creative board of International Children's Foundation "STELETOJ" – Sofia.

Stanev also worked with mixed choir "Planinarska Pesen" - Sofia (1994–1999), the mixed choir "Rodina" - Stara Zagora (2004). He has been the conductor of symphony concerts and is the author of folk songs arrangements and choir compositions.

References

1974 births
Living people
People from Kotel, Bulgaria
Bulgarian conductors (music)
21st-century conductors (music)